Andrew P. Carter is a British structural biologist who works at the Medical Research Council (MRC) Laboratory of Molecular Biology (LMB) in Cambridge, UK. He is known for his work on the microtubule motor dynein.

Education 
Carter studied Biochemistry at the University of Oxford, graduating in 1999. He obtained a PhD in 2003 from the MRC Laboratory of Molecular Biology where he worked with Venki Ramakrishnan on the ribosome. He was a member of the team in Ramakrishnan's lab that solved the first X-ray crystal structure of the small (30S) ribosomal subunit. Carter also determined structures of 30S bound to antibiotics and bound to the initiation factor IF1. Ramakrishnan shared the Nobel prize in Chemistry for the team's work on the 30S.

Career and research 
Carter was a post-doc in Ron Vale's lab at University of California, San Francisco from 2003 to 2010. During his post-doc, he studied the molecular motor protein, dynein using  X-ray crystallography and single molecule fluorescence microscopy.

He became a group leader at MRC Laboratory of Molecular Biology in Cambridge in 2010 where he uses X-ray crystallography, electron microscopy, and single molecule microscopy assays to understand how dynein transports cargo. His group solved X-ray crystal structures of the dynein motor domain showing how it generates force to pull cargos along microtubules and reconstituted a recombinant dynein, showing how its processive movement is activated by cofactors/cargo adaptors. His group used cryoEM to solve the structure of dynein's cofactor dynactin and the full length dynein complex.  They showed how dynein and dynactin come together in the presence of cargos and how this activates transport.

Grants, awards and honours 

 2001 Clare College Junior Research Fellowship
 2002 Max Perutz PhD Student Prize (MRC Laboratory of Molecular Biology)
 2003  Agouron Institute / Jane Coffin Childs Memorial Fund Fellowship
 2006 Leukemia & Lymphoma Society Special Fellow Award
 2010 Fellow of Clare College and Director of Studies for Biological Sciences
 2012 EMBO Young Investigator Program
 2012 Wellcome Trust New Investigator Award
 2016 Member, European Molecular Biology Organisation (EMBO)
 2018 Wellcome Trust Investigator Award

References 

Structural biologists
Alumni of the University of Oxford
University of California, San Francisco faculty
Year of birth missing (living people)
Living people
21st-century British biologists